The 1988 MTV Video Music Awards aired live on September 7, 1988, from the Universal Amphitheatre in Los Angeles. Hosted by Arsenio Hall, the show honored the best music videos released between May 2, 1987 and April 1, 1988.

Australian rock band INXS was both the most-nominated and most-awarded artist at the show, winning five of their nine nominations, including the awards for Video of the Year and Viewer's Choice for "Need You Tonight/Mediate". This marked the first of a few instances in VMA history where the same artist and music video won both awards at the same ceremony. Other artists with multiple nominations included George Harrison and U2, who earned eight each.

The category for Best Overall Performance in a Video was eliminated from the award lineup while the category for Most Experimental Video was renamed to "Breakthrough Video", a name it would keep until the 2010 MTV Video Music Awards, after which it was also removed from the lineup.

Background
Nominees were revealed on July 12, 1988. Dick Clark was announced as the show's producer on August 1 while Arsenio Hall was named a co-host—no other co-host was subsequently announced. Clark's hiring was rooted in MTV's desire to streamline the ceremony by bringing in a producer with experience in music and award ceremony broadcasting. On show-day, the live broadcast was preceded by the 1988 MTV Video Music Awards Pre-Game Show, during which Ken Ober and Colin Quinn highlighted the nominated videos.

Performances

Presenters 
 David Coverdale and Tawny Kitaen – presented Best Group Video
 Eric Roberts and Teri Garr – presented Best Video from a Film
 Bryan Ferry and Melanie Griffith – presented Breakthrough Video
 Crowded House – presented Best New Artist in a Video
 Elvira, Mistress of the Dark, and Magic Johnson – presented Best Concept Video
 DJ Jazzy Jeff & The Fresh Prince and Justine Bateman – presented Best Stage Performance in a Video
 Peter Gabriel – presented the Video Vanguard award to Michael Jackson during his acceptance segment in London
 Suzanne Vega and Robert Downey, Jr. – presented Best Direction in a Video
 Julie Brown and Downtown Julie Brown – presented Best Choreography in a Video; also appeared in pre-commercial segments about what was 'coming up' on the show
 The Bangles – presented Best Male Video
 Cyndi Lauper and Rod Stewart – presented Viewer's Choice
 Aerosmith – presented Best Female Video
 Cher and Hall – presented Video of the Year

Winners and nominees 
Nominees were selected from "a list of 644 videos that were exhibited for the first time on MTV between May 2, 1987, and April 1, 1988." Two rounds of voting were used to first select ten semifinalists followed by five finalists in each category. Winners were selected in the third round of voting. The selection of semifinalists was open to "record company executives, record and video retailers, radio station program directors, the press, attorneys, agents, and artists," while the selection of finalists was open to the 1,800 members of MTV's Video Music Awards (VMA) voting body. Winners were selected by the VMA voting body (general categories), members of the music video industry (professional categories), or MTV viewers (Viewer's Choice and Hall of Fame). 

Winners are listed first and highlighted in bold.

Other appearances
 Jim Turner (as "Randee of the Redwoods") and Kevin Seal – appeared in pre-commercial vignettes about Viewer's Choice voting procedures
 Ken Ober – appeared in a couple of pre-commercial segments telling viewers what was 'coming up' on the show
 Paul Reiser – performed a brief stand-up routine and introduced Jody Watley
 Bobby McFerrin – sang the eligibility and voting rules for the 1988 VMAs
 Jim Turner (as "Randee of the Redwoods") – appeared in a pre-commercial segment telling viewers what was 'coming up' on the show
 Adam Curry and Kevin Seal – introduced the winners of the professional categories; also appeared in pre-commercial segments about what was 'coming up' on the show
 Sam Kinison – performed a stand-up routine and introduced Guns N' Roses
 Penn & Teller – performed a magic routine

References

External links 
Official MTV site

1988
MTV Video Music Awards
MTV Video Music Awards
1988 in Los Angeles